Dalhousie is a neighbourhood in the northwest area of Calgary. It is bounded to the north by John Laurie Boulevard, to the east by Shaganappi Trail, to the south by Crowchild Trail and to the west by Sarcee Trail.

Dalhousie was established in 1967 and was named for George Ramsay, 9th Earl of Dalhousie. It is represented in the Calgary City Council by the Ward 7 councillor.

The community is served by the Dalhousie station of the C-Train LRT system.

Demographics

Residents in this community had a median household income of $59,298 in 2000, and there were 17.1% low income residents living in the neighbourhood. As of 2000, 24.1% of the residents were immigrants. A proportion of 25.1% of the buildings were condominiums or apartments, and 26.8% were used for renting.

Education
As of 2006, there are four schools in the district: Dalhousie Elementary School, West Dalhousie Elementary School and H.D. Cartwright Junior High School in the public system, and St. Dominic in the Separate (Catholic) system. Students in Dalhousie continue on to Sir Winston Churchill High School in the public system, or St. Francis High School in the Catholic system.

See also
List of neighbourhoods in Calgary

References

External links
Dalhousie Community Association

Neighbourhoods in Calgary